In mathematics, a p-adically closed field is a field that enjoys a closure property that is a close analogue for p-adic fields to what real closure is to the real field.  They were introduced by James Ax and Simon B. Kochen in 1965.

Definition 

Let  be the field  of rational numbers and  be its usual -adic valuation (with ).
  extends  (that is,  for all ),
(Note that the value group of K may be larger than that of F since it may contain infinitely large elements over the latter.)

The formally p-adic fields can be viewed as an analogue of the formally real fields.

The field of 5-adic numbers (which contains both the rationals and the Gaussian rationals embedded as per the place w) is also formally 5-adic.

When F is formally p-adic but that there does not exist any proper algebraic formally p-adic extension of F, then F is said to be p-adically closed.  For example, the field of p-adic numbers is p-adically closed, and so is the algebraic closure of the rationals inside it (the field of p-adic algebraic numbers).

If F is p-adically closed, then:
 there is a unique valuation w on F which makes F p-adically closed (so it is legitimate to say that F, rather than the pair , is p-adically closed),
 F is Henselian with respect to this place (that is, its valuation ring is so),
 the valuation ring of F is exactly the image of the Kochen operator (see below),
The first statement is an analogue of the fact that the order of a real-closed field is uniquely determined by the algebraic structure.

The definitions given above can be copied to a more general context: if K is a field equipped with a valuation v such that
 the residue field of K is finite (call q its cardinal and p its characteristic),
 the value group of v admits a smallest positive element (call it 1, and say π is a uniformizer, i.e. ),
 K has finite absolute ramification, i.e.,  is finite (that is, a finite multiple of ),
(these hypotheses are satisfied for the field of rationals, with q=π=p the prime number having valuation 1) then we can speak of formally v-adic fields (or -adic if  is the ideal corresponding to v) and v-adically complete fields.

The Kochen operator 

If K is a field equipped with a valuation v satisfying the hypothesis and with the notations introduced in the previous paragraph, define the Kochen operator by:

(when ).  It is easy to check that  always has non-negative valuation.  The Kochen operator can be thought of as a p-adic (or v-adic) analogue of the square function in the real case.

An extension field F of K is formally v-adic if and only if  does not belong to the subring generated over the value ring of K by the image of the Kochen operator on F.  This is an analogue of the statement (or definition) that a field is formally real when  is not a sum of squares.

First-order theory 

The first-order theory of p-adically closed fields (here we are restricting ourselves to the p-adic case, i.e., K is the field of rationals and v is the p-adic valuation) is complete and model complete, and if we slightly enrich the language it admits quantifier elimination.

Notes

References 

 
 
 
 

Field (mathematics)
P-adic numbers